The Little Wing Roto-Pup is an American autogyro that was designed and produced by Little Wing Autogyros, Inc. of Mayflower, Arkansas, introduced in the 1990s. Now out of production, when it was available the aircraft was supplied as a kit for amateur construction.

Design and development
It features a single main rotor, a single-seat open cockpit with a windshield and conventional landing gear without wheel pants.

The aircraft fuselage is made from welded 4130 steel tubing and is based on the Preceptor Ultra Pup airframe. The airframe may be covered with dope and fabric or left uncovered. To meet the FAR 103 Ultralight Vehicles empty weight, the frame is required to be left uncovered, but this does not affect aircraft handling.

The aircraft uses an unusual control system, common to all the Little Wing Autogyros and designed by David Kay in the early 1930s. It uses a mast that is fixed fore-and-aft, but which pivots laterally for banking the aircraft. Longitudinal control is achieved by an elevator and horizontal stabilizer system, designed to eliminate power-induced bunting "push-over" accidents.

The manufacturer estimated the construction time from the supplied kit as 200 hours.

Operational history
By 1998 the company reported that 13 kits had been sold and three aircraft were completed and flying.

Specifications (Roto-Pup)

See also
List of rotorcraft

References

Roto-Pup
1990s United States sport aircraft
1990s United States ultralight aircraft
1990s United States civil utility aircraft
Homebuilt aircraft
Single-engined tractor autogyros